Kerala Blasters is an Indian professional football club based in Kochi, Kerala. The club participates in the Indian Super League since its inception. The club was established on 27 May 2014 and began their first professional season a few months later in October 2014. They play their home matches at the Jawaharlal Nehru Stadium.

Indian Super League
As of 3 March 2023

Note: The following table contains the results of Kerala Blasters Football Club against all the clubs participating in the Indian Super League. 
Defunct clubs are marked in Italics.

{| class="wikitable sortable" style="text-align:center;"
|-
! rowspan="2" width="150" |Club
!P!!W!!D!!L!!P!!W!!D!!L!!P!!W!!D!!L!!P!!W!!D!!L
! rowspan="2" |Win %
! rowspan="2" |First
|- class="unsortable"
! colspan="4" |Home
! colspan="4" |Away
! colspan="4" |Neutral
! colspan="4" |Total
|-
| align="left" |ATK Mohun Bagan
|  |7
|  |2
|  |2
|  |5

|  |7
|  |2
|  |3
|  |2

|  |6
|  |0
|  |1
|  |5

|2014
|-
| align="left" |Chennaiyin FC
|  |7
|  |3
|  |2
|  |2
|  |8
|  |0
|  |4
|  |4
|  |4
|  |2
|  |2
|  |0

|2014
|-
| align="left" |Odisha FC
|  |9
|  |4
|  |4
|  |1

|  |8
|  |2
|  |3
|  |3

|  |4
|  |2
|  |1
|  |1

|2014
|-
| align="left" |FC Goa
|  |7
|  |3
|  |1
|  |3

|  |7
|  |1
|  |0
|  |6

|  |  4
|  |  0
|  |  3
|  |  1

|2014
|-
| align="left" |Mumbai City FC
|  |7
|  |1
|  |4
|  |2
|  |7
|  |1
|  |2
|  |4
|  |4 
|  |2  
|  |0  
|  |2  

|2014
|-
| align="left" |NorthEast United FC
|  |7
|  |4
|  |3
|  |0
|  |7
|  |3
|  |1
|  |3
|  |4
|  |1
|  |2
|  |1

|2014
|-
| align="left" |FC Pune City
|  |5
|  |3
|  |1
|  |1
|  |5
|  |2
|  |2
|  |1
|  |  -
|  |  -
|  |  -
|  |  -

|2014
|-
| align="left" |Bengaluru FC
|  |4
|  |2
|  |0
|  |2
|  |5
|  |0
|  |1
|  |4
|  |4
|  |1
|  |1
|  |2

|2017
|-
| align="left" |Jamshedpur FC
|  |4
|  |1
|  |3
|  |0

|  |4
|  |1
|  |1
|  |2

|  |  6
|  |  2
|  |  3
|  |  1

|2017
|-
| align="left" |Hyderabad FC
|  |2
|  |1
|  |0
|  |1

|  |2
|  |1
|  |0
|  |1

|  |  5
|  |  2
|  |  1
|  |  2

|2019
|-
| align="left" |SC East Bengal
|  |1
|  |1
|  |0
|  |0

|  |1
|  |0
|  |0
|  |1

|  |4
|  |1
|  |3
|  |0

|2020
|-
! align="left" |Total
!  |60
!  |25
!  |20
!  |15

!  |61
!  |13
!  |17
!  |31

!  |45
!  |13
!  |17
!  |15

!
|-
|}

Super Cup
As of 22 June 2020Note: The following table contains the results of Kerala Blasters Football Club against the clubs which they faced in the Super Cup .

Durand Cup 
As of 31 August 2022

Note: The following table contains the results of Kerala Blasters Football Club against the clubs which they faced in the Durand Cup.

See also
Kerala Blasters
Kerala Blasters FC Reserves and Academy
List of Kerala Blasters FC records and statistics
List of Kerala Blasters FC Seasons
List of Kerala Blasters FC players
List of Kerala Blasters FC managers

References

Kerala Blasters FC
Indian football club statistics